Cindy Tsai (born 9 July 1985) is an American chess player.

Biography 
She was born in Chicago, Illinois and grew up in Gainesville, Florida. Her family is from Taiwan. At age 7, chess teacher George Pyne taught Tsai how to play chess. In later youth, her trainers were George Rottman, Arno Nolting, Tim Hartigan and grandmaster Gabriel Schwartzman. At Stanford University in Stanford, California, she was awarded the  Chapell-Lougee Scholarship for psychology research in France and Switzerland in 2007. After graduating, she became a customer care manager at smartphone company Peek in New York City. In 2009 to 2011, Tsai completed the Master of Business Administration program at the Kellogg School of Management at Northwestern University near Chicago, Illinois.

Chess career 
The World Chess Federation FIDE awarded Tsai lifetime title and Woman International Master in 2002 when she was age 16. Tsai achieved 2 of three Woman Grandmaster (WGM) norms. As a professional chess player, she played 147 total games from 1995 to 2008 with 65 wins (44.2%).

From 1995 to 2003, Tsai competed for the US team in annual World Youth and Pan-American Youth Chess Championships in Brazil, France, Spain, Bolivia, Argentina, Paraguay, Ecuador and India. At the World Youth Chess Championships, Tsai finished 5th place twice. In Pan American Chess Championship for female youth, Cindy Tsai won 5 titles: U14 in May 1998 in Florianópolis, U16 in June 2000 in Bento Gonçalves, Rio Grande do Sul, U16 in June 2001 in Guaymallén Department, U20 in June 2002 in La Paz, and U20 in September 2004 in Guayaquil.

In her early career, Tsai played for the Hidden Oak Elementary School in Gainesville, Florida.

In the British Four Nations Chess League (4NCL), she played in 2005/06 two games for the Oxford team. Tsai was inactive since the 2005/06 until she played for the US women's national team at the 2008 World Mind Sports Games in Beijing, China.

References 

1985 births
Living people
American female chess players
Chess Woman International Masters
American people of Taiwanese descent
Kellogg School of Management alumni
Sportspeople from Chicago
People from Gainesville, Florida
21st-century American women